(nee Awojobi) was a Nigerian actress best known for her character role (Ireti) in Fuji House of Commotion.

Education
Sola Onayiga studied Theatre Arts at Obafemi Awolowo University.

Career
Onayiga acted in several radio plays and soaps. Her first act on radio play was Gandu Street where she acted as Madam Sikira. Her first television act was in a soap opera titled Checkmate. Her character role in Fuji House of Commotion made her popular as Ireti.

Personal life
Sola Onayiga died on July 18, 2022, at the Lagos State University Teaching Hospital.

Filmography
Gandu Street - as Madam Sikira
Oragbala - as Olori Debomi
The King Must Dance Naked - as Mama Odosu
Fuji House of Commotion - as Ireti 
Checkmate

References

20th-century births
 2022 deaths
 Nigerian film actresses
Yoruba actresses
 Obafemi Awolowo University alumni
Nigerian television actresses
Actresses in Yoruba cinema